New Hope is an unincorporated community in eastern Jackson Township, Preble County, Ohio, United States. It is located along U.S. Route 35 approximately 2.5 miles (4 km) east of Campbellstown and 5 miles (8 km) northwest of Eaton. The community is part of the Dayton Metropolitan Statistical Area. The community is served by National Trail High School and the National Trail Local School District.

History
New Hope was laid out in 1841. The post office in the community was called Upshur. This post office was established in 1844, and remained in operation until 1906.

References

Unincorporated communities in Preble County, Ohio
Unincorporated communities in Ohio